Jhawail Union is a union of Gopalpur Upazila, Tangail District, Bangladesh.

Demographics
According to the 2011 Bangladesh census, Jhawail Union had 8,355 households and a population of 32,675. The literacy rate (age 7 and over) was 42.3% (male: 44%, female: 40.8%).

See also
 Union Councils of Tangail District

References

Populated places in Tangail District
Unions of Gopalpur Upazila